Stephen Hugh Salter,   (born 7 December 1938) is Emeritus Professor of Engineering Design at the University of Edinburgh and inventor of the eponymous Salter duck wave energy device. Salter is also a proponent of geoengineering and is responsible for creating the concept of the mechanical enhancement of clouds to achieve cloud reflectivity enhancement.

The wide tank at the University of Edinburgh—a novel design and invention by Salter, built in 1977—was the world's first multi-directional wave tank equipped with absorbing wavemakers. Feedback control systems on the wavemaking flaps were used for the absorption of reflected waves, propagating along the water surface of the tank interior towards the 89 flaps.

Salter is a Specialist Advisor at wave energy company Aquamarine Power advising on the development of the Oyster wave energy converter.

Salter "has been one of the leading voices" of the marine cloud brightening movement.

Salter's duck

While historic references to the power of waves do exist, the modern scientific pursuit of wave energy was begun in the 1970s by Salter, in response to the oil crisis. His 1974 invention became known as Salter's Duck or Nodding Duck, although it was officially referred to as the "Edinburgh Duck".  In small scale controlled tests, the Duck's curved cam-like body can stop 90% of wave motion and can convert 90% of that to electricity. According to sworn testimony before the House of Parliament, The UK Wave Energy programme was shut down on 19 March 1982, in a closed meeting. An analysis of Salter's Duck resulted in a miscalculation of the estimated cost of energy production by a factor of 10, an error which was only recently identified. Some wave power advocates believe that this error, combined with a general lack of enthusiasm for renewable energy in the 1980s (after oil prices fell), hindered the advancement of wave power technology.

Honours and awards
Salter was appointed Member of the Order of the British Empire (MBE) in the 2004 Birthday Honours for services to engineering. 
In 2012 he received the Royal Academy of Engineering Sustained Achievement Award.
In 2021 he was inducted into the Scottish Engineering Hall of Fame.

References

Further reading
 
 

1938 births
Living people
People from Johannesburg
Academics of the University of Edinburgh
Fluid dynamicists
Members of the Order of the British Empire
Fellows of the Royal Society of Edinburgh
People associated with renewable energy
Scottish Engineering Hall of Fame inductees